The 2022 MTN 8 was the 48th edition of the knockout competition featuring the top 8-placed teams at the conclusion the previous DStv Premiership season and the 15th under its current name.

Teams
The following 8 teams are listed according to their final position on the league table of/for the previous season of the 2021-22 DStv Premiership

 Mamelodi Sundowns
 Cape Town City
 Royal AM
 Stellenbosch
 Kaizer Chiefs
 Orlando Pirates
 AmaZulu
 Supersport United

Quarter–finals
The fixtures were confirmed following the conclusion of the previous season based on the competition format as follows:

Semi–finals 
1st leg.

Final

Statistics

Goals 
3 goals

 Monnapule Saleng

1 goal 

 Augustine Kwem
 Khanyisa Mayo 
 Lehlohonolo Majoro
 Vincent Pule
 Thabiso Monyane
 Shaun Mogaila
 Ashley Du Preez
 Sihle Nduli
 Marcelo Allende
 Abubeker Nassir
 Keagan Dolly
 Gabadinho Mhango
 Kermit Erasmus

References 

MTN 8
2022 domestic association football cups
2022–23 in South African soccer